Dexter has been the name of more than one ship of the United States Revenue Cutter Service and United States Coast Guard, and may refer to:

 , a cutter in commission in the Revenue Cutter Service from 1830 to 1841
 , a cutter in commission in the Revenue Cutter Service from 1874 to 1908
 , a cutter in commission in the Coast Guard from 1925 to 1936
 , previously WAGC-18, later WHEC-385, a cutter in commission in the Coast Guard from 1946 to 1952 and from 1958 to 1968

United States Coast Guard ship names